Didier Tamayo (born 20 July 1939) is a Colombian fencer. He competed in the individual and team foil and épée events at the 1964 Summer Olympics.

References

1939 births
Living people
Colombian male épée fencers
Olympic fencers of Colombia
Fencers at the 1964 Summer Olympics
Colombian male foil fencers
20th-century Colombian people